South Korean animation,  or aeni, has become an industry that produces characters for other countries' companies, exports its creations globally and generates billions of dollars in profits.

Etymology
The word aeni comes from the English word "animation" as written in Hangeul, 애니메이션 (aenimeisyeon), similar to Japanese アニメーション (animēshon). Just like anime, aenimeisyeon was shorten to aeni. However, aeni usually refers to Japanese animation in colloquial usage, although it can refer to Korean animation or animation in general. To distinguish it from its Japanese counterpart, Korean animation is often called hanguk aeni (lit. Korean animation) or guksan aeni (lit. domestic animation).

A Sino-Korean term manhwa yeonghwa (Hanja: 漫畫映畫), a portmanteau of manhwa and the Korean term for movie, is also used as a general term for all animation.

History

The South Korean animation industry was in a period of crisis throughout the 2000s. Depression at the reality of being an industry that the West merely gave factory-type drawing to begin to sink in. This followed the 1990s, a period of explosive growth for the industry when Korean studios made most of their profits from OEM, mostly from the United States, or Japan.

In many ways, 2011 was a bright transitional year for Korean animation, with home-produced animated feature films finally finding box office success in South Korea, instead of facing the usual financial failure. As far as overseas export market is concerned, the likes of Rough Draft Korea (RDK) kept on landing new contracts, which have seen Rough Draft perform the manual work on over 45 popular Western cartoon titles over 16 years.

South Korean animation has boomed in popularity in Eastern Asia with the success of the series Pororo the Little Penguin and Origami Warriors in 2011, leaving fans wanting to discover more Korean animations. This success is due in part to perfecting the Korean animation technique, and financial returns being reinvested into new animated products.

Some Korean animators still blame the booming Korean game industry for draining the animation industry's talent pool, but the box office success of the Korean animated film Leafie in 2011 in South Korea is inspiring a new generation.

Animation industry
Animation contracts for Korean animation studios range from collaboration/minor contribution contracts, to most of the work. The South Korean animation industry can be considered dynamic as there are more than a hundred animation studios. While it is mostly firms in South Korea that contract with Western studios, some of the work is reported to be subcontracted to North Korea as well.

Korean animation characters in public spaces

Larva subway was a subway based on and featured a Larva character. It operated from November 2014 until May 2015 on line No. 2. The Seoul government and Metro explained that they wanted to give citizens a chance to celebrate the 40th anniversary of the subways opening.
Tayo buses were organized by the Seoul Metropolitan Government, the Bus Transport Business Association, and the animation company which made Tayo the Little Bus for the Public Transportation Day. In 2014, the Seoul Metropolitan Government commissioned buses designed as the characters of  Tayo the Little Bus to go around the Gwanghwamun Square area of the city.
In 2014, statues of Larva and Pororo the Little Penguin were installed in World Park, which is a square in the Lotte World II Hotel. They were well received by citizens and tourist.

Market
In 2010, according to the Korea Creative Content Agency, the Korean market share of domestic characters was about 28% and the remaining 72% was for foreign characters, such as those from Japan and USA. In 2014, the domestic character market share soared to 40% and its value in 2013 had reached .

Korean characters as international business 
Before the emergence of Korean domestic characters, characters that enjoyed popularity were mostly from the United States and Japan. However, as the industry matured and grew in size, domestic characters received preference not just domestically but also internationally.

See also

 List of Korean animated films
 List of korean animated series
North Korean animation
Anime
Cinema of Korea
donghua
Manhwa
Taiwanese animation
Video gaming in South Korea
Webtoon

References

External links

History of Korean animation 
History of robot anime of South Korea　(in Japanese, with images & video clip)
Korean animated movie posters
Fanzine article listing RDK outsourced cartoons

 
Korean animation